Poole and Hunt Company Buildings is a national historic district in the Hampden neighborhood of northwestern Baltimore, Maryland, United States. It is a complex of fieldstone and brick buildings on a  site. They were erected in 1853 and enlarged periodically as the need arose for the Poole and Hunt Engineering Company, who produced machinery and castings for a worldwide market from 1853 to 1889. A devastating fire on September 17, 1995, destroyed much of the fabric of the machine shop.

It was added to the National Register of Historic Places in 1973.

References

External links

, including undated photo, at Maryland Historical Trust

Industrial buildings and structures on the National Register of Historic Places in Baltimore
Woodberry, Baltimore
Historic districts on the National Register of Historic Places in Maryland
1853 establishments in Maryland